Euseius plaudus is a species of mite in the family Phytoseiidae.

References

plaudus
Articles created by Qbugbot
Animals described in 1973